William H. Angoff (September 14, 1919 – January 5, 1993) was an American research scientist. He worked for the Educational Testing Service (ETS), where he helped improve the SAT and authored books about testing.

Early life
Angoff was born on September 14, 1919, in Boston, Massachusetts. He graduated from Harvard University and earned a master's degree followed by a PhD from Purdue University.

Career
Angoff first worked as a psychological testing expert for the United States Army during World War II.

Angoff worked for the Educational Testing Service (ETS) from 1950 to 1993. He became the director of developmental research in 1976. Over the course of his career, he helped improve the SAT, an exam taken by millions of American high school graduates. He also promoted the use of testing in his speeches and writing.

Personal life and death
With his wife Eleanor, Angoff had a son and a daughter. They resided in Princeton, New Jersey.

Angoff died of a heart attack on January 5, 1993, in Princeton.

Selected works

References

1919 births
1993 deaths
People from Boston
People from Princeton, New Jersey
Harvard University alumni
Purdue University alumni
American scientists